Butte Valley National Grassland is a  United States National Grassland located in northern California. Administered by the United States Forest Service, Klamath National Forest, it is located in northern Siskiyou County, near the Oregon border, between the communities of Dorris and Macdoel along U.S. Highway 97. It was dedicated in July 1991 as the nation's 20th National Grassland.  It is administered as part of the Klamath National Forest, and is the sole National Grassland in California and in Region 5 (Pacific Southwest) of the Forest Service. Administrative offices are located in Macdoel, California.

Geography
It consists primarily of flat, sandy soils and a dry lake bed. The area includes sweeping views of the Cascade Range and Mount Shasta.

History
The area attracted homesteaders in the late 19th century who ditched, drained, plowed, and grazed the land. Overuse caused a decline in productivity that was exacerbated by the drought of the 1930s. The U.S. government purchased submarginal lands in 1937. In the 1940s a portion of the area was used as bombing range. Grazing of the land continued until its designation as a National Grassland in 1991.

Flora and fauna
The current habitat of the grassland consists of open sagebrush, rabbit brush, juniper and native bunch grasses.

Bird watching is a popular recreational activity. Birds found in the grassland include sage thrasher and Brewer's sparrow in the spring, summer and fall. Resident bird species include the horned lark and lark sparrow. Nesting raptors include golden eagle, prairie falcon, red-tailed hawk and Swainson's hawk, drawn by resident rodents in the fields. Ferruginous hawk have successfully nested in recent years.

See also

Native grasses of California
Grasslands of California

References

External links
 Butte Valley National Grassland - Klamath National Forest

Grasslands of California
National Grasslands of the United States
Protected areas of Siskiyou County, California
Cascade Range
Klamath National Forest